Agrupación de Baloncesto Pas, also known as Pas Piélagos, is a basketball team based in Renedo de Piélagos, Cantabria, Spain, who currently plays in Liga EBA.

History
AB Pas was founded in 1979 in Castañeda, Cantabria. In the 1983–84 season, Pas becomes runner-up of 1ª Autonómica League and promotes to the lowest national leagues.

In 1991, the team goes to Renedo de Piélagos, where nowadays continue playing. The team promotes to 2ª División, 1ª División and Liga EBA on 2004 after being champions of the Cantabrian group of 1ª División.

In 2008, Pas Piélagos plays the promotion playoffs to LEB Bronce, but could not win any game in the final stage.

Season by season

External links
Official website

Basketball teams in Cantabria
Liga EBA teams